Adana American College for Girls was a prominent high school in Adana, Turkey that served from 1880 to 1927. Founded by the American missionary, protestant teachings of the school mostly attracted students from the Armenian community of the city. 

Adana American College was one of the many missionary schools that were founded during the late 19th century in the Ottoman Empire.

History
The school was opened in 1880 after the construction of the first building, now located at the east side of the school campus. The larger building was built just next to the Cemal Gürsel street in 1914.  American High School was closed by the Government of Turkey in 1927, and the school building was used as a state high school (Tepebağ Lisesi) since then.

References

Education in Adana
Landmarks in Adana
Buildings and structures in Adana
Educational institutions established in 1880
1880 establishments in the Ottoman Empire